Elections for the National Administration Council were held in Uruguay on 8 February 1925. The result was a victory for the National Party, which won 49.3% of the vote.

Results

References

Elections in Uruguay
Uruguay
National Administration
Uruguay
Election and referendum articles with incomplete results